Abdelhaq Nadir (born 15 June 1993) is a Moroccan boxer. He competed in the men's lightweight event at the 2020 Summer Olympics.

References

External links
 
 
 
 

1993 births
Living people
Moroccan male boxers
Olympic boxers of Morocco
Boxers at the 2020 Summer Olympics
Place of birth missing (living people)
Competitors at the 2018 Mediterranean Games
Competitors at the 2022 Mediterranean Games
Mediterranean Games medalists in boxing
Mediterranean Games silver medalists for Morocco
Mediterranean Games bronze medalists for Morocco
Competitors at the 2019 African Games
African Games medalists in boxing
African Games gold medalists for Morocco
21st-century Moroccan people